Wacera is a surname of Kenyan origin. Notable people with the surname include:

Mary Wacera Ngugi (born 1988), Kenyan long-distance runner
Nini Wacera (born 1978), Kenyan actress and director

Kenyan names
Surnames of African origin